Raymond Howard "Ray" Boltz (born June 14, 1953) is a retired singer and songwriter who first came to wide notice in contemporary Christian music. Many of his songs tell stories of faith and inspiration.

Background 

Raised by his parents William and Ruth Boltz in Muncie, Indiana, Ray Boltz is the middle of his parents' three children (a fourth child died shortly after birth). Boltz was married to Carol (nee Brammer) Boltz for 33 years (1975-2008), and they have four children: Karen, Philip, Elizabeth and Sara. Boltz graduated from Ball State University with a degree in business and marketing.

Boltz was virtually unknown when he wrote "Thank You", which won the Song of the Year prize at the 1990 GMA Dove Awards. His song "I Pledge Allegiance to the Lamb" also won a Dove Award for Inspirational Recorded Song of the Year, at the 25th GMA Dove Awards in 1994. After the release of Songs from the Potter's Field in 2002, and his last tour in 2004, Boltz retired from the music industry. He separated from his wife in 2005 before moving to Fort Lauderdale, Florida, with their divorce being finalized in early 2008.

On September 12, 2008, during an interview with the Washington Blade, Boltz disclosed that he was gay. Since then, Boltz has performed at several churches of the Metropolitan Community Church, a gay-affirming Christian denomination.

In 2010, he released the album True, which won Album of the Year at the OUTMusic Awards. Boltz currently lives in Fort Lauderdale, Florida, with his husband Franco Sperduti, who is also his talent agent.

Awards 

Boltz has twice been a recipient at the Gospel Music Association's Dove Awards. "Thank You" received the 1990 Song of the Year award, and "I Pledge Allegiance to the Lamb" received the 1994 award for Inspirational Song. He also was one of various artists contributing to God with Us: A Celebration of Christmas Carols & Classics, which won the 1997 award for Special Event Album.

Discography 

1986 Watch the Lamb
1988 Thank You
1989 The Altar
1991 Another Child to Hold
1992 Seasons Change
1994 Allegiance
1995 The Concert of a Lifetime (live, RIAA Gold)
1996 No Greater Sacrifice
1997 A Christmas Album: Bethlehem Star
1998 Honor and Glory
2000 The Classics
2001 Concert of a Lifetime for Kids [live]
2002 Songs from the Potter's Field
2004 The Unchanging Story
2010 True

Compilation albums

1994 Moments for the Heart  (RIAA Gold Certified)
2001 Moments for the Heart, Vol. 1 & 2
2010 All The Best

Charts

References

External links
 

1953 births
Living people
American male singer-songwriters
American performers of Christian music
American gay musicians
Christian music songwriters
LGBT people from Indiana
LGBT Protestants
American LGBT singers
American LGBT songwriters
Gay songwriters
People from Muncie, Indiana
20th-century American LGBT people
21st-century American LGBT people
Singer-songwriters from Indiana
American gay writers